Bayfield County is the northernmost county in the U.S. state of Wisconsin. As of the 2020 census, its population is 16,220. Its county seat is Washburn. The county was created in 1845 and organized in 1850. The Red Cliff Band of Lake Superior Chippewa has a reservation in Bayfield County and is the county's largest employer.

History
Originally, in 1848 it was named La Pointe County, Wisconsin. After Douglas (1854) and Ashland (1860) Counties were split off from the original La Pointe County, the remainder was renamed Bayfield County on April 12, 1866.

Geography
It is the third-largest county in Wisconsin by total area and second-largest by land area.

Adjacent counties
 Ashland County – east
 Sawyer County – south
 Washburn County – southwest
 Douglas County – west
 Lake County, Minnesota – north

Major highways

Buses
Bay Area Rural Transit
Indian Trails
List of intercity bus stops in Wisconsin

Airport 
Cable Union Airport  serves Bayfield County and the surrounding communities.

National protected areas
 Apostle Islands National Lakeshore (part)
 Chequamegon National Forest (part)
 Whittlesey Creek National Wildlife Refuge

Demographics

2020 census
As of the census of 2020, the population was 16,220. The racial makeup of the county was 83.2% White, 10.5% Native American, 0.4% Black or African American, 0.2% Asian, 0.6% from other races, and 5.2% from two or more races. Ethnically, the population was 1.7% Hispanic or Latino of any race.

2010 census
As of the 2010 census, there were 15,014 people living in the county. 86.7% were White, 9.6% Native American, 0.3% Asian, 0.3% Black or African American, 0.2% of some other race and 2.9% of two or more races. 1.1% were Hispanic or Latino (of any race).

2000 census

As of the census of 2000, there were 15,013 people, 6,207 households, and 4,276 families living in the county. The population density was 10 people per square mile (4/km2). There were 11,640 housing units at an average density of 8 per square mile (3/km2). The racial makeup of the county was 88.46% White, 0.13% Black or African American, 9.39% Native American, 0.27% Asian, 0.01% Pacific Islander, 0.26% from other races, and 1.49% from two or more races. 0.61% of the population were Hispanic or Latino of any race. 23.3% were of German, 10.4% Norwegian, 8.4% Swedish, 6.1% Irish, 5.9% Polish, 5.7% Finnish and 5.0% English ancestry. 96.8% spoke English as their first language.

There were 6,207 households, out of which 28.90% had children under the age of 18 living with them, 55.90% were married couples living together, 7.80% had a female householder with no husband present, and 31.10% were non-families. 26.40% of all households were made up of individuals, and 11.50% had someone living alone who was 65 years of age or older. The average household size was 2.40 and the average family size was 2.88.

In the county, the population was spread out, with 24.60% under the age of 18, 5.30% from 18 to 24, 25.20% from 25 to 44, 28.50% from 45 to 64, and 16.40% who were 65 years of age or older. The median age was 42 years. For every 100 females there were 102.20 males. For every 100 females age 18 and over, there were 100.70 males.

In 2017, there were 116 births, giving a general fertility rate of 66.6 births per 1000 women aged 15–44, the 23rd highest rate out of all 72 Wisconsin counties. Additionally, there were fewer than five reported induced abortions performed on women of Bayfield County residence in 2017.

Communities

Cities
 Ashland (mostly in Ashland County)
 Bayfield
 Washburn (county seat)

Village
 Mason

Towns

 Barksdale
 Barnes
 Bayfield
 Bayview
 Bell
 Cable
 Clover
 Delta
 Drummond
 Eileen
 Grand View
 Hughes
 Iron River
 Kelly
 Keystone
 Lincoln
 Mason
 Namakagon
 Orienta
 Oulu
 Pilsen
 Port Wing
 Russell
 Tripp
 Washburn

Census-designated places
 Cable
 Cornucopia
 Drummond
 Grand View
 Herbster
 Iron River
 Port Wing

Unincorporated communities

 Ashland Junction
 Barksdale
 Bark Point
 Benoit
 Delta
 Ino
 Lake Owen
 Leonards
 Moquah
 Muskeg
 Namekagon
 Pike River
 Radspur
 Pureair
 Oulu
 Red Cliff
 Salmo
 Sand Bay
 Sioux
 Sutherland
 Topside
 Wills

Politics
Bayfield County is a Democratic bastion, having voted for the Democrat in every presidential election since 1960, except 1972.

See also
 Lake Namakagon
 National Register of Historic Places listings in Bayfield County, Wisconsin
 Red Cliff Band of Lake Superior Chippewa
 USS Bayfield (APA-33)
List of counties in Wisconsin

References

Further reading
 Bayfield County, Wisconsin: Its Past, Present and Future. n.p., 1905.

External links

 Bayfield County government website
 Bayfield County Economic Development Corporation
 Bayfield County map from the Wisconsin Department of Transportation

 
1850 establishments in Wisconsin
Populated places established in 1850